Randall Bell (born 1959), is a socio-economist, real estate economist and appraiser, expert witness, and author based in Los Angeles, California known for dealing with stigmatized property. Bell is an expert on real estate damages, who authored a highly-referenced textbook on the subject, and was called "Dr. Disaster" by The Wall Street Journal.  Bell's notable cases include: Nicole Brown Simpson's Los Angeles condominium, the mansion where 39 Heaven's Gate members died of suicide, the JonBenét Ramsey's house in Colorado, the World Trade Center site, and properties damaged in the Rodney King riots and by Hurricane Katrina.

Early life and education
Bell grew up in Fullerton, California as the son of an engineer and homemaker, and attended Troy High School. He has an MBA from UCLA. He received his doctoral degree from Fielding Graduate University in Santa Barbara, California, with a dissertation on the socioeconomic reasoning of Hurricane Katrina survivors.

Career
Bell began working on appraisals of environmental and asbestos damage in the 1980s. He has also assessed Chinese drywall and sink holes. In 1992, Bell assessed the damages of the Rodney King riots in Los Angeles. After the riots, he decided to focus only on damaged properties. Also in 1992, Bell created the Bell Chart, a rating system that categorizes the 10 types of detrimental conditions and their corresponding economic damages of properties. The system ranks properties from class 1 (no detrimental effects) to class 10 (an incurable condition). In 1994, he began assessing stigmatized properties such as the damages of the Northridge earthquake and wildfires in Malibu, California. In 1997, he became the national director of the Real Estate Damages practice of Price Waterhouse. He left the firm in 1999, and co-founded Bell Anderson & Sanders with two partners. He is presently CEO of Landmark Research Group.

Bell works with properties that have been affected by crime, environmental contamination, construction defects, reported hauntings, and natural disasters. He has consulted on Nicole Brown Simpson's condominium; the Beverly Hills estate where Charles Manson's followers murdered Sharon Tate and four other people in 1969; the Rancho Santa Fe mansions where the bodies of 39 Heaven's Gate cult members were found, the house in Boulder, Colorado, where JonBenét Ramsey was killed; the home of Sandy Hook Elementary School shooter Adam Lanza; and the house of Las Vegas shooter Stephen Paddock. He has also consulted on Hurricane Katrina; the Bikini Atoll in the Marshall Islands; the September 11 attacks at the World Trade Center; and the United Airlines Flight 93 crash site in Shanksville. Bell has traveled to Chernobyl, Hiroshima; to the World Trade Center site; and to Egypt, Jordan, Israel and West Bank to find comparisons in properties damaged by terrorist attacks. He has also traveled to Antarctica to interview scientists about climate change and how it affects costs, such as insurance for home owners. The Appraisal Institute published Bell's book Real Estate Damages: Applied Economics and Detrimental Conditions in 2008. In 2011, Bell returned from Guam, where he consulted with landowners whose property included the cave where Shoichi Yokoi, a Japanese army sergeant, hid for 28 years, unaware that World War II had ended. The landowners opened a theme park on the property.

In recent years, Bell has begun writing self-help books, inspired by his interactions with disaster victims and his personal experiences with overcoming trauma and obstacles. 

Bell hosted the 2020 docuseries, Distressed Real Estate, produced by Topic Studios.

Bibliography
Real Estate Damages: An Analysis of Detrimental Conditions (1999)
Property Owners Manual (2004)
Owners Manual (2004)
Business Owners Manual (2004)
Home Owners Manual (2004)
Disasters: Wasted Lives, Valuable Lessons (2005)
Strategy 360: 10 Steps for Creating a Complete Game Plan for Business & Life (2008)
Rich Habits Rich Life (2016)
Me We Do Be: The Four Cornerstones of Success (2017)
Leo Fender: The Quiet Giant Heart Around the World (2017)
Post-Traumatic Thriving (2021)

Personal life
Randall Bell lives in Laguna Beach, California with his wife and has four children. Bell volunteers at the Laguna Beach homeless and rehabilitation center, Friendship Shelter.

References

Further reading 
 How to Sell a Murder House, According to the Expert

American real estate businesspeople
Living people
UCLA Anderson School of Management alumni
American male non-fiction writers
People from Fullerton, California
Writers from California
American business writers
20th-century American non-fiction writers
20th-century American businesspeople
21st-century American non-fiction writers
21st-century American businesspeople
Fielding Graduate University alumni
People from Laguna Beach, California
Businesspeople from California
1959 births
20th-century American male writers
21st-century American male writers